North Scottsdale is a rural locality in the local government area of Dorset in the North-east region of Tasmania. The 2016 census determined a population of 122 for the state suburb of North Scottsdale.

History
North Scottsdale was previously known as Bungana. The locality was gazetted in 1956.

Geography
The Arnon River and Great Forester River each form part of the eastern boundary.

Road infrastructure
The C831 route (Burnside Road / North Scottsdale Road / Jensen's Road) enters from the south-west and runs north-east and south-east before exiting. Route C832 (North Scottsdale Road / Old Waterhouse Road) enters in the south-west and runs through to the north-east before exiting. Route C834 (Forester Road) starts at an intersection with C832 and runs east before exiting.

References

Localities of Dorset Council (Australia)
Towns in Tasmania